Broxbourne railway station is on the West Anglia Main Line serving the towns of Broxbourne and Hoddesdon in Hertfordshire, England. Its three-letter station code is BXB and it is in fare zone B.

The station and all trains serving it are operated by Greater Anglia.

History
Broxbourne station was officially opened by the Northern and Eastern Railway on 15 September 1840. It was on the company's proposed line to Cambridge, but the next section of the line to Latton Mill (Harlow) was not opened until August 1841. Therefore, for a short period of time Broxbourne was the terminus for the line which ran up the Lea Valley from Stratford Junction, where it joined the Eastern Counties Railway. The original station building was demolished in 1959 and replaced with new buildings designed by H.H. Powell, of the British Railways Eastern Region Architects' Department with T. Rainier as the Project Architect.

The station was Grade II listed in March 2009; "one of a very small number of post-war railway stations of clear architectural distinction".

Ticket barriers were installed in 2011.

The centre platforms (platforms 2 and 3) were extended to accommodate 12-coach trains in December 2011, though initially no 12-coach trains were scheduled to call.

Of the four platforms, platform 1 is used by terminating or starting services to and from Liverpool Street, Stratford and Hertford East, platform 2 is used by services to Liverpool Street and Stratford, platform 3 is used by services to Hertford East, Cambridge and Bishops Stortford, and platform 4 is used by services to Hertford East and Bishops Stortford.

Service

The typical Monday-Saturday off-peak service is:

4 tph (trains per hour) to London Liverpool Street, of which:
2 call at Cheshunt and Tottenham Hale, taking 28 minutes.
2 call at Cheshunt, Waltham Cross, Enfield Lock, Brimsdown, Ponders End, Tottenham Hale and Hackney Downs, taking 36 minutes.
2 tph to Stratford, of which
1 calls at Cheshunt, Enfield Lock, Northumberland Park, Tottenham Hale and Lea Bridge.
1 calls at Cheshunt, Waltham Cross, Tottenham Hale and Lea Bridge.
2 tph to Hertford East, calling at Rye House, St Margarets and Ware, taking 17 minutes.
2 tph to Bishops Stortford, of which:
1 calls at Roydon, Harlow Town, Harlow Mill and Sawbridgeworth
1 calls at Harlow Town and Sawbridgeworth
 1 tph to Cambridge calling at Harlow Town, Bishop's Stortford, Audley End and Whittlesford Parkway, taking 46 minutes.
1 tph to Cambridge North which calls at Roydon, Harlow Town, Harlow Mill, Sawbridgeworth, Bishop's Stortford, Stansted Mountfitchet, Elsenham, Newport, Audley End, Great Chesterford, Whittlesford Parkway, Shelford and Cambridge taking 64 minutes.
In the peak selected services continue further to Waterbeach before terminating at Ely.

On Sundays the general service pattern is:
2 tph to London Liverpool Street, of which:
1 calls at Cheshunt and Tottenham Hale, taking 30 minutes.
1 calls at Cheshunt, Tottenham Hale and Hackney Downs.
2 tph to Stratford, calling at Cheshunt, Waltham Cross, Enfield Lock, Brimsdown, Ponders End, Tottenham Hale and Lea Bridge.
2 tph to Hertford East as above, taking 18 minutes.
 1 tph to Cambridge, of calling at Harlow Town, Sawbridgeworth, Bishop's Stortford, Audley End Whittlesford Parkway and Shelford.
1 tph to Cambridge North which calls at all stations (as above).

References

External links

Railway stations in Hertfordshire
 DfT Category C2 stations
Former Great Eastern Railway stations
Railway stations in Great Britain opened in 1840
Greater Anglia franchise railway stations
Grade II listed railway stations
Grade II listed buildings in Hertfordshire
Broxbourne